The National Archaeological Museum of Metaponto is a museum housing the archaeological finds from the Greek city of Metapontum, now Metaponto, Basilicata, Italy. It replaces the small Antiquarium built near the Heraion (temple of Hera) outside the walls of the Tavole Palatine.

References

Further reading
Soprintendenza Archeologia della Basilicata: Museo Archeologico Nazionale di Metaponto - Bernalda (Mt)
Soprintendenza Archeologia della Basilicata: Museo Archeologico Nazionale di Metaponto - Bernalda (Mt): Per Parco Metaponto (pdf)
E-Borghi.com: Museo archeologico nazionale di Metaponto
Joseph Coleman Carter, Discovering the Greek Countryside at Metaponto, The University of Michigan Press - Ann Arbor, 2006
Laura Arcieri, Il Museo archeologico nazionale di Metaponto, in "Mondo Basilicata: rivista di storia e storie dell'emigrazione", n. 15/16 (2008), pp. 69-73

Museums in Basilicata
Archaeological museums in Italy